Kenny Burrell Live at the Village Vanguard is a live album by guitarist Kenny Burrell recorded at the Village Vanguard in late 1978 and released on the Muse label. The album was rereleased on CD along with Kenny Burrell in New York as 12-15-78.

Reception 

The Allmusic review called it a "among the finest Burrell recorded in the '70s".

Track listing 
 "Second Balcony Jump" (Billy Eckstine, Gerald Valentine) – 5:51
 "Willow Weep for Me" (Ann Ronell) – 6:50
 "Work Song" (Nat Adderley) – 4:25
 "Woody 'n' You" (Dizzy Gillespie) – 7:31
 The Introduction by Kenny Burrell of Max Gordon, Village Vanguard – 1:05
 "In the Still of the Night" (Cole Porter) – 9:09
 "Medley: Don't You Know I Care?/Love You Madly" (Duke Ellington) – 6:38
 "It's Getting Dark" (Kenny Burrell) – 5:30

Personnel 
Kenny Burrell – electric guitar
Larry Gales – bass
Sherman Ferguson – drums

References 

Kenny Burrell live albums
1980 live albums
Muse Records live albums
Albums recorded at the Village Vanguard